Ogwen may refer to:

Places 
Ogwen (electoral ward), covering the village of Bethesda in Gwynedd, Wales
Afon Ogwen, a river in Gwynedd, Wales
Llyn Ogwen, its source
Dyffryn Ogwen or Ogwen Valley, its valley
Ogwen Cottage, an outdoor education centre by Llyn Ogwen
Ogwen Group, an Ordovician lithostratigraphic group in Gwynedd, north-west Wales
Ogwen Rural District, a former rural district in Caernarfonshire, Wales from 1894 to 1974

People 
 John Ogwen, Welsh actor